Cuando los hijos se van may refer to:

Cuando los hijos se van (1941 film)
Cuando los hijos se van (1969 film), film by Estudios Churubusco
Cuando los hijos se van (telenovela)